Michael Arthur may refer to:

 Michael Arthur (physician) (born 1954), Vice-Chancellor of the University of Leeds, 2004–2013 and President and Provost of UCL 2013–2021
 Michael Anthony Arthur (born 1950), British diplomat
 Mike Arthur (born 1968), American football player
 Mickey Arthur (born 1968), South African-Australian cricketer

See also